Milutin Uskoković (4 June 1884 - 15 October 1915) was a Serbian short story writer and soldier.

Biography
Milutin Uskoković was born at Užice, Serbia, on 4 June 1884 and killed himself at Kuršumlija in southern Serbia on 15 October 1915 while witnessing the tragic retreat of the Serbian army. His suicide note read: "I can no longer endure the destruction of my fatherland!"

He graduated from University of Geneva's Law School with a Doctor of Jurisprudence degree  in 1910.

Like Veljko Miličević, Uskoković mixed fiction with journalism. He served as a war correspondent embedded with the Serbian army in the Balkans Wars and in World War I. To both journalism and fiction he brought an unusually rich and varied preparation.

As a novelist and short-story writer, Uskoković came to hold definite theories of the purpose and value of fiction, which he set forth in the essays collected after his death. He wrote, "Crtice" (1901) and poems in prose "Pod životom" (1905) and "Vitae freagmenta" (1908). His short stories "Kad ruže cvetaju" (1911) first appeared in magazines. Then two novels came, "Čedomir Ilić," published in 1914, and "Došljaci," published posthumously in 1919.

Works 
 Pod životom : crtice, pesme u prozi, pesme, članci o književnosti, 1905
 Vitae fragmenta,1908
 Došljaci, 1910
 Kad ruže cvetaju, 1912
 Les traites d Union douaniere en droit international, 1910
 Čedomir Ilić, 1914
 Dela, 1932
 Usput, 1978

References

Sources
 Jovan Skerlić, Istorija nove srpske književnosti (Belgrade, 1914/1921) page 466

1884 births
1915 deaths
Writers from Užice
People from the Kingdom of Serbia
University of Geneva alumni
War correspondents of the Balkan Wars
1915 suicides
Suicides by drowning
Suicides in Serbia